Life on a Thread (Spanish:La vida en un hilo) is a 1945 Spanish comedy film written, directed and produced by Edgar Neville. Neville later modified the film for the stage, with an adaptation of the same name.

It was remade twice, as a Mexican film La engañadora in 1955, directed by José Díaz Morales and as Spanish film titled Una mujer bajo la lluvia in 1992 directed by Gerardo Vera.

Cast
Conchita Montes as Mercedes
Rafael Durán as Miguel Ángel
Guillermo Marín as Ramón
Julia Lajos as Madame Dupont
Alicia Romay as Isabel
Juana Mansó as Escolástica (as Juanita Mansó)
Joaquín Roa as Contacos
María Brú as Doña Encarnación
Eloísa Muro as Doña Purificación
Julia Pachelo as Mariana
Manuel París as Marchante
Enrique Herreros as Taxista
César de Nueda as Amigacho
Rosario Royo		
Josefina de la Torre		
Joaquina Maroto		
María Saco		
Carlos Álvarez Segura		
Manuel Ocaña as Arrigurrita
Kurt Dogan as Violinista

References

Bibliography

External links 
 

1945 films
1945 comedy films
Spanish comedy films
1940s Spanish-language films
Spanish black-and-white films
Spain in fiction
Madrid in fiction
Films directed by Edgar Neville
1940s Spanish films